The 2019 Postnord UCI WWT Vårgårda West Sweden Team time trial features as the 17th round of the 2019 UCI Women's World Tour. It was held on 17 August 2019, in Vårgårda, Sweden. The TTT was ridden on a 36 km long course, starting in Vårgårda and going out and back to Herrljunga.

Teams

Fourteen professional teams each with a maximum of six riders, will start the race:

UCI Women's WorldTeams

Results

External links

References

Open de Suède Vårgårda
Postnord UCI WWT Vargarda
Postnord UCI WWT Vargarda
UCI Women's World Tour races
Postnord UCI WWT Vargarda